Coram Deo Academy (CDA) is a classical Christian school offering a University-Model or five-day schedule for students in grades Pre-K to 12. CDA has three North Texas campuses located in Collin County, Dallas, and Flower Mound.

Academic programs 
Coram Deo Academy consists of a Grammar School (Elementary School, grades PreK-4), Logic School (Middle School, grades 5-8), and Rhetoric School (High School, grades 9-12).

Athletics and fine arts 
Coram Deo Academy offers a number of sports, including basketball, football, track, volleyball, and more. Fine arts programs include band, choir, speech and debate, drama, visual arts, and more.

Campuses
Coram Deo Academy has 3 campus locations in DFW:

 The Flower Mound campus (PreK-12) is located at 4900 Wichita Trl. Flower Mound, TX  75022.
 The Collin County campus (PreK-12) was established in 2004, and is located at 9645 Independence Pkwy. Plano, TX  75025.
 The Dallas campus (PreK-10) was established in 2006, is located at 6930 Alpha Rd. Dallas, TX 75240.
 The CDA District Offices are located at 417 Oakbend Dr. Lewisville, TX 75067.

Notable alumni
James Hanna, former tight end in the NFL for the Dallas Cowboys. He transferred after his sophomore season to Flower Mound High School

References

External links

 Coram Deo Academy

Christian schools in Texas
Private K-12 schools in Texas
High schools in Collin County, Texas
High schools in Denton County, Texas
Schools in Dallas
1999 establishments in Texas
Educational institutions established in 1999
Classical Christian schools